Ferdows (also Romanized as Ferdos, Ferdous, and Firdaus; named Toon or Tūn until 1929) is a city in the Central District in northern Ferdows County, South Khorasan province, Iran, and serves as capital of the county. Ferdous is located on the main axis connecting Yazd, Kerman, Isfahan, Bushehr, Hormozgan and Fars provinces to Mashhad. Ferdows city is 1293 meters above sea level. 

At the 2006 census, its population was 23,405 in 6,538 households. The following census in 2011 counted 25,968 people in 7,316 households. The latest census in 2016 showed a population of 28,695 people in 8,749 households.

After the Khorasan province was divided into 3 provinces, Ferdows County was initially a part of Razavi Khorasan province, but was incorporated within the borders of South Khorasan Province in March 2007.

History 

Founded by the Medes, Ferdows is currently a city. It was a large and famous city in ancient days. There is an unproven theory that the town's name in ancient days was "Taban" (or shining; تابان in Persian). In Islamic times it became known as Toon or Tūn, a name retained until 1929, when it was changed to Ferdows.

The first people to inhabit Ferdows were traditionally a group of Sagartians. Toon was a famous and thriving city both before and during the Islamic era, until the raid of the Mongols. It was one of the most prominent cities of Ghohestan, along with Qaen; Nasir Khusraw mentioned Toon as a large city in the 11th century. Toon was plundered and destroyed by the Mongols in 1239. After the Mongol invasion, Toon eventually recovered and became one of the major cities of Ghohestan again. Marco Polo mentioned the south Khorasan region as Toonoqaen, apparently in reference to the two largest cities, Toon and Qaen.

In early 1751 the town was captured by Ahmad Shah Durrani during his invasion of Khorasan under Shahrokh Shah.

Ferdows was still a famous and prosperous city in Khorasan at the beginning of the 20th century and the Municipality of Ferdows, originally formed in 1925 (under the name of Toon), was one of the first Municipalities of Khorasan province. But the city was devastated in a huge earthquake in 1968 and significantly declined thereafter.

Geography 
Ferdows is located on the Plateau of Iran, between a desert region (mainly to the south and west) and a mountainous region (especially to the north and east). Most of villages around Ferdows are situated in the mountainous region to the north and northeast. The nearest town, Eslamieh, lies just 3 km northeast. The city lies on the main route from Kerman, Yazd, Bandar Abbas and other southern cities to Mashhad and hosts more than 6 million pilgrims annually on their way to Mashhad.  It is also a nexus of several roads converging from different areas of Iran.

Climate 

The climate is mild in the spring, hot in the summer, cool and rainy in autumn, and cold in the winter. Being located near deserts, the temperature difference between day and night, and also between summer and winter, is relatively high. The majority of precipitation occurs from mid-autumn to mid-spring. The hottest month is July (mean minimum temperature 21.8 °C, mean maximum temperature 36.6 °C) and the coldest is January (mean minimum temperature -1 °C, mean maximum temperature 10.3 °C)

Main sights

Major visitor attractions of Ferdows are:
 Ferdows Hot Mineral Spring: one of the most important attractions of Ferdows for Iranian and International tourists
 Ferdows Religious School (belonged to Safavid dynasty)
 Ferdows Congregation Mosque (Jame' Mosque of Ferdows) (belonged to Seljuk dynasty)
 Ferdows Hole-in-the-Rock, a natural geological formation
 Polond Desert, a beautiful desert located 40 kilometers West of Ferdows
 Ferdows Museum

Education and culture 
Education and culture Ferdows currently has several higher education centers:     

 Islamic Azad University, Ferdows
 Ferdows  and Qaen Medical Schools
 Ferdows Institute of Higher Education
 Ferdows Faculty of Engineering

Products 
Ferdows is famous for its high quality Saffron and pomegranate.

Emad Nezam Tourism Complex 
It is located in the city of Ferdows, launched by remarkable and notable entrepreneur in Iran, Dr MohammadReza Amirhassankhani. He believes in the desert district of Ferdows with beautiful sightseeing and tourist destinations, investing his money there since years ago. The large Complex includes a variety of subsectors:
 Emad Nezam Traditional Hotel
 Emad Nezam Scientific, cultural and recreational collection affiliated with Mofid educational complex
 Emad Nezam Sports Club
 Emad Nezam Football Academy
 Mofid Educational Complex
 Polond Desert Tourism Camp

Notable people 
 Badiozzaman Forouzanfar
 Mohammad Jafar Yahaghi
 Mulla Alaul Maulk Tuni
 Alireza Danesh Sokhanvar

See also

 1968 Dasht-e Bayaz and Ferdows earthquakes
 AH78
 Road 91 (Iran)

Notes

External links
 Toun Under ICHHTO Protection

 

Cities in South Khorasan Province

Populated places in South Khorasan Province

Populated places in Ferdows County